Marymount College was a four-year liberal arts college located in Salina, Kansas that opened in 1922 as a women's college. It was operated by the Sisters of St. Joseph of Concordia, Kansas. The original college was a three-story building that overlooked the Smoky Hill River. The single building on its  campus dominated the eastern edge of the city. 

The school was accredited by the Higher Learning Commission in 1932. In the 1950s and 1960s, two dormitories and a Fine Arts building were erected. The three dormitories on campus housed 350 resident students. Marymount became coeducational in 1968, which met with mixed reactions from students and faculty. A multi-purpose physical education building was erected in 1971. Basketball coach Ken Cochran was hired for the 1970-71 year and two years after Marymount had begun to admit male full-time students.

Cochran developed a women's program in physical education and built the school into a NAIA powerhouse, racking up a record of 285–56 in eleven seasons. The Marymount team enjoyed a streak of 106 straight home court wins, reached a national ranking in 10 years, and won a third place finale in 1976. 

Marymount closed in June 1989, in a year that had an enrollment of 653 students.

The Marymount records and student transcripts have been housed at several institutions since the closure. The student records are now stored at Kansas Wesleyan University. Earlier locations for records included St. Mary of the Plains College and Fort Hays State University in Hays, Kansas.

Life After College

The campus is now used as the Kansas Highway Patrol Training Center and the patrol's statewide dispatch center.  The training center had formerly been based at the Salina Municipal Airport.

Notable alumni
 Tyrees Allen - Television and Broadway actor
 Mona Pasquil - Former Lieutenant Governor of California
 Kevin Willmott - Writer and film director

References

 

Defunct Christian universities and colleges
Defunct Catholic universities and colleges in the United States
Defunct private universities and colleges in Kansas
Educational institutions established in 1922
Educational institutions disestablished in 1989
Former women's universities and colleges in the United States
Education in Salina, Kansas
Buildings and structures in Saline County, Kansas
Catholic universities and colleges in Kansas
Roman Catholic Diocese of Salina
Sisters of Saint Joseph colleges and universities
1922 establishments in Kansas
1989 disestablishments in Kansas